The Greyhound Bus Station at 1465 Chester Avenue, Cleveland, Ohio, is a bus station designed by William Strudwick Arrasmith in the Streamline Moderne style. Built by Greyhound Lines, it opened in 1948. It is on the National Register of Historic Places.

References

External links 

Transportation buildings and structures in Cleveland
Streamline Moderne architecture in the United States
Bus stations in Ohio
National Register of Historic Places in Cleveland, Ohio
Transport infrastructure completed in 1948
1948 establishments in Ohio
Greyhound Lines
Bus stations on the National Register of Historic Places